Juan Karlos "JK" Labajo (born February 5, 2001) is a German-Filipino actor, singer, songwriter, guitarist, and television personality. He is co-managed by ABS-CBN's Star Magic and MCA Music Inc. (Philippines). He is currently the frontman of the band Juan Karlos.

He auditioned for ABS-CBN's reality singing competition The Voice Kids (Philippines season 1) shown from June to July 2014. He finished third place.

After his stint at The Voice Kids, he debuted his acting career in the drama anthology Maalaala Mo Kaya playing himself for his own life story. He also played the role of Charles Kenneth "CK" Rodriguez in  Hawak-Kamay in 2014 and as Vincent "Amboy" Mobido in Pangako Sa 'Yo from 2015 up to 2016. He also played as Lucas Noble, the son of Ian Veneracion and Iza Calzado's characters in the defunct Philippine romantic family drama A Love to Last.

Early life and education
Juan Karlos Labajo was born on February 5, 2001, and raised in Consolacion, Cebu, Philippines by his mother, Maylinda Labajo. His father left them when he was still a baby. His mother died when he was twelve years old, on November 17, 2013. He now lives with his Uncle Jovanni and Grandmother Linda in Metro Manila.

Before he joined The Voice Kids, Labajo experienced bullying, especially in school. The bullies, who usually acted in groups, teased and punched him because of his looks. Although his Caucasian looks gave the impression that his family was well-off, they were, in fact, in debt and were forced to move often. To help out, Labajo collected and sold junk. He later revealed that at the time he made the semi-finals of The Voice Kids, his grandmother Erlinda asked for financial support from Cebu Governor Hilario Davide III. Although the amount was only P100, he was still grateful for the governor's support.

Career

2014:The Voice Kids, Star Magic, Hawak Kamay, MMK
Labajo performed his own rendition of Adam Sandler's song, "Grow Old With You", for ABS-CBN's The Voice Kids season 1 blind auditions, which was broadcast on June 7, 2014. Coaches Sarah Geronimo and Bamboo Mañalac both pressed their buttons to choose him for their teams. Geronimo praised his storytelling. The double selection gave Labajo the choice of coaches. Although Geronimo invited him to be a guest star at her upcoming concert, he picked Mañalac. His new coach called him "the funniest kid I have ever met".

Labajo advanced to the four-person finals after singing "Sway" during the live semi-finals held at the Newport Performing Arts Theater in Resorts World Manila. From the public votes, he received the third-highest total of the semi-finalists, after Lyca Gairanod and Darren Espanto. During the first and second rounds of the finals, Labajo performed "Yesterday" and "Runaway Baby" by The Beatles and Bruno Mars respectively. Coach Lea Salonga said, "You have the looks, the charm, and the heart. With those three, you're guaranteed a future in this business." Mañalac gave him a similar comment: "I see a singer, an artist, and possibly an actor. I see someone who has the charisma to do it all." For the final round in the finals, Labajo sang a duet with Gary Valenciano, the upbeat song "Eto Na Naman". At the end of the competition, he once again came in third from the voting.

After the season of The Voice Kids Philippines Labajo, along with his other three co-finalists in The Voice Kids, officially became a part of Star Magic, ABS-CBN's training and management center.

Labajo's first project as part of Star Magic was in ABS-CBN's family drama series Hawak-Kamay. A preview on August 15, 2014, showed him with the show's cast. His fellow The Voice Kids finalist, Lyca Gairanod, joined him in the cast on August 22. He has also appeared in the Philippine drama anthology series Maalaala Mo Kaya.

2015: Ipaglaban Mo, Pangako Sa 'Yo, Debut Album

To continue Labajo's acting career he played as Nico in ABS-CBN's TV Series Ipaglaban Mo: Sa Dulo ng Daan episode last May 9, 2015. Labajo was also cast in "Pangako Sa 'Yo" and plays the role of "Amboy Mobido", one of Yna's friends and is the brother of "Egoy"/Jonathan Mobido (Grae Fernandez ) At auditions for a church play "Josephine the Dreamer" Amboy is filled with awe as he sees the beautiful Lia Buenavista daughter of Governor Buenavista known to Amboy as "Lia B". At the auditions when it is time for Lia to tryout Amboy love struck as usual interrupts constantly to tell the judges to give the part. Although Amboy thinks Lia sings beautifully but she does not get the part. Later on Lia tries again for a second time and both Amboy and Egoy are there. As they watch the auditions Egoy innocently falls in love but tries to resist knowing how much his brother loves her. Egoy and Amboy's contributions to the storyline of the show will start to intertwine as the series continues.

In August 2015, Labajo released his debut album, "JK". It has a total of 8 songs, including a special band version of "Para Sa 'Yo," and an acoustic version of "This Gravity". "Di Ka Man Lang Nagpaalam" is a special song on the album, because JK dedicates it to his late mother.

In October, he was the MYX Celebrity VJ for the month of October, which was his first time.

2016: We Love OPM: The Celebrity Sing-Offs, Pinoy Big Brother: Lucky 7

In May 2016, Labajo was one of the contestants in the Filipino reality music competition show We Love OPM The Celebrity Sing-Offs on ABS-CBN which was aired from May 14, 2016, to July 17, 2016. His other co-teammates were The Voice Kids Season 2 Finalist Kyle Echarri and PBB 737 Teens' Finalist Bailey May. Their CelebriTeam's name was supposedly "Poon and Fork", Labajo jokingly suggested to their mentor Richard Poon, but Poon declined Labajo's witty suggestion. And so, the three decided that their CelebriTeam's name would be Voice Next Door. They performed the songs Sa Kanya popularized by Martin Nievera, Pangarap na Bituin by Sharon Cuneta, Lalake by Hagibis, Paano by Gary Valenciano, Kung Tayo'y Magkakalayo by Rey Valera with the Oh My Girls CelebriTeam which consists of Alexa Ilacad, Ylona Garcia, and Krissha Viaje, Macho Gwapito by Rico J. Puno, Sayang na Sayang by Aegis, Wag Kang Pabebe by Vice Ganda, and Blue Jeans by APO Hiking Society.

Labajo wasn't present in some episodes due to fever or for having another schedule during the taping of those episodes. From week nine of the show until the semi-finals, Labajo was permanently absent due to his competition in Pinoy Big Brother: Lucky 7 in Vietnam and in the Philippines. And so his co-teammates Kyle Echarri and Bailey May were the only ones left in the group. The Voice Next Door was eliminated in the Semi-finals of the show.

After, Labajo with Andrea Brillantes and the other Kapamilya Teen Stars' production in ASAP last July 3, 2016, Robi Domingo and Toni Gonzaga announced that he will be joining the new Pinoy Big Brother: Lucky 7. Labajo shared some of his expectations and said that he is excited to be part of the reality show. On "Day 0", he, Yassi Pressman, Jinri Park, Mccoy De Leon, and Nikko Natividad were introduced as the first five celebrity housemates. They were flown from Manila to Vietnam becoming the show's first time out of the country experience. Although, Jinri, JK, and Hideo were the only ones left due to their visa and immigration conflict.

On "Day 2", the three were finally able to arrive in Vietnam after the immigration and visa issue. In that morning, they were chained and blindfolded inside the living room in the Big Brother Vietnam House, making the housemates to unchain them within 30 minutes. Luckily, they were successful with their task.

On "Day 19", Labajo came back to the PBB House, since the girl housemates were able to guess him while they were blindfolded.

During their second Lucky Task which was to come up with a water puppet show, Labajo suggested something but Nonong and Chacha didn't approve to his suggestion, making him feel ignored. Labajo later on went to the confession room to have some advice from Kuya. He cried for a little inside the confession room because he felt like he didn't have any worth since he was the youngest among the celebrity housemates. Kuya told him to be more open to his housemates since they were his second family. Nonong and Chacha suspected that he wasn't feeling okay, and so they asked him what was wrong. Labajo didn't say anything about it and both Nonong and Chacha gave him the offer to control the puppets, but he refused and stuck with playing the guitar for the music of their water puppet show. After their successful task, the three of them talked again until Labajo admitted that he was feeling ignored with his suggestions by them. Also, he followed Kuya's advice to be open to them.

On July 15's episode of the show, Kuya asked Labajo in the confession room about his personal life. He then shared about his past in Cebu, how hard it was for him and how he felt about it. After Kuya asking him about his mother, he teared up and told Kuya how regretful he was because he wasn't able to spend much time with his mother like how others kids do with theirs. He also shared that he was present during his mother's death. Kuya told him that his mother is very proud of him, regardless of wherever she is. Kuya also told him that he has come far from where he was, and that he will experience more as he grows older so that he should live his life as a child since he still is.

During the celebrity housemates' Big Jump Challenge, Labajo's helper for that challenge was his younger half-brother Louie Stephan Labajo, who made him shock when he first saw him after many months. After the Big Jump Challenge, Labajo was in the confession room. Kuya asked how his relationship with his brother was, and he told him that it was a neighborly type. He admitted that he was jealous of his mother's second family since his mother spent more of her time with her family rather than with him. He also mentioned that he and his two younger half-brothers weren't close, making him say that he always wanted a sibling. Although mentioned earlier, he wasn't close with them. He cried but Kuya told him that he's still young and he has the ability to spend his time with his brothers because dreams can be reached.

 Labajo was unable to pass the Big Jump Challenge, making him be evicted along with Nonong, Elisse, Yassi, and Hideo on Day 23. Moreover, on Day 32 which was the PBB: Lucky 7 Teen Edition, he guested during the SwerTeen Ball, surprising Vivoree Esclito, one of the housemates who didn't have a partner that time. He was asked by Kuya to play Vivoree's own song composition, which he did.

2017: A Love to Last, Sophomore Album, Debut Movie

From the first day of January up until the 28th, Labajo served as the MYX Celebrity VJ for the month of January, his second time wherein his first was last October 2015. On January 9, 2017, ABS-CBN's A Love to Last premiered nationwide on television, making his first appearance on the first episode playing the role of Lucas Noble, the son of Anton Noble IV and Grace Silverio-Noble. On January 16, MCA Music announced on their social media accounts that his first ever major solo concert and birthday concert entitled, "JKL Live" was "postponed indefinitely due to unforeseen circumstances." Last February 6, 2017, Labajo's second album entitled, "JKL", was released in selected Astroplus and Astrovision stores. His album consists of 8 tracks with his 3 own compositions entitled, "Demonyo", "Forever" a wedding song, and "Move On" which he composed when he was still in PBB. It also comes up with an EDM-like version.

This February 13, his first ever movie appearance was in the movie premiere of Joven Tan's indie film "Tatlong Bibe" along with his former contestant in The Voice Kids Philippines, Lyca Gairanod, Marco Masa, Raikko Mateo, and others. He is the grandson of Eddie Garcia in the movie and is paired up with Sharlene San Pedro. The film's opening nationwide was on March 1.

As Lucas Noble in A Love to Last, bashing from the viewers leads his way to improvement in acting. "The people on set, I ask them, is it okay na ganito or baka masira ako or whatever? Tapos sabi nila it's actually great kasi effective daw 'yung acting ko. Sabi nila I should be proud kasi naaapektuhan ang mga tao," he said in an interview just recently. "I am flattered kasi for me, I am not good enough so I really feel happy when people compliment me with all those really amazing stuff. Pero actually wala pa akong acting workshops so I am really planning on doing some acting workshop kasi I really feel I need it," he said. JK mentioned that A Love to Last was his biggest break so far, and that he's blessed to be working with actors who are much more advanced than he is such as Ian Veneracion who plays as his father in the show, Iza Calzado who is his mother that betrayed him, and Bea Alonzo as Andrea Agoncillo, the fiancé of Anton.

2018: Juan Karlos, Buwan

In 2018, JK revealed that he is forming a band named after him.
He released his most popular song "Buwan" (moon in English) in June 2018 and it is a soulful alternative rock song.

Influences
Labajo stated that he wanted to have a career in the entertainment industry since he was very young because he wanted to leave a mark in the world. He was also influenced by his late mother, who hoped he would win a television singing contest. Recently, he's been sharing both in interviews and social media that some of his inspirations in his career are Daniel Day-Lewis, Joel Torre, and some other known jazz artists like Django Reinhardt and Bill Evans. He is also an aspiring photographer.

Personal life
On 30 May 2017, Labajo was in a relationship with actress and model, Maureen Wroblewitz, until they broke up on 10 June 2022.

Filmography

Movies

TV drama series

Reality and variety shows

Discography

Album

Singles

Chart performance

Concert

Accolades

Notes

References

External links 
 

2001 births
Filipino child singers
21st-century Filipino male singers
Filipino male child actors
Filipino people of German descent
The Voice Kids (Philippine TV series) contestants
2014 in Philippine television
Living people
Singers from Cebu
Male actors from Cebu
Star Magic
ABS-CBN personalities
Pinoy Big Brother contestants
Universal Music Group artists
Island Records artists